Hampshire County Council (HCC) is an English council that governs eleven of the thirteen districts geographically located within the ceremonial county of Hampshire. As one of twenty-four county councils in England, it acts as the upper tier of local government to approximately 1.4 million people.

Whilst they form part of the ceremonial county of Hampshire, the city councils of Southampton and Portsmouth are independent unitary authorities. The council comprises 78 elected councillors, who meet in the city of Winchester, which is the county town.

Since 1997, the council has been controlled by the Conservative Party. In May 2022, Rob Humby was elected as leader of the council.

In November 2022, the county council stated it, alongside Kent County Council, may face bankruptcy within 12 months due to austerity cuts.

History 

In 1889, following the commencement of the Local Government Act 1888, the administrative county of Hampshire was formed. In 1974, the towns of Christchurch and Bournemouth were transferred to Dorset by the Local Government Act 1972; this occurred alongside a number of minor changes to the council's boundaries. Under the same local government reorganisation, various boroughs, urban and rural districts were reorganised into thirteen new districts. As part of a new two-tier arrangement of local government, these new districts formed the lower tier. 

Following the grant of a coat of arms in 1992 (see left), the Local Government Act 1992 formed the Local Government Commission for England. In 1997, the commission formed the unitary authorities of Southampton and Portsmouth which became independent of Hampshire County Council. Since the most recent local government changes, the council have made several attempts to form a devolution deal. In 2014 the Hampshire and Isle of Wight Local Government Association unanimously agreed to support a 'pan-Hampshire bid', however, the bid was eventually unsuccessful.

Responsibilities

The council is responsible for public services such as: 
Highway management
Waste disposal
Children's services (including schools, families and young people)
Social care
Libraries
Discovery Centres
Country parks
Public Health,

Local government

Hampshire is divided into thirteen districts, with eleven of them lying within Hampshire County Council. Italics denote unitary authorities, who do not come under Hampshire County Council:

Test Valley
Basingstoke and Deane
Hart
Rushmoor
Winchester
East Hampshire
New Forest
City of Southampton (unitary)
Eastleigh
Fareham
Gosport
City of Portsmouth (unitary)
Havant

Elections

The most recent Hampshire County Council elections were held on 6 May 2021. The Conservatives retained overall control of the council, taking 56 of the 78 seats on the council. The Liberal Democrats are the largest opposition group, with 17 seats.

From 1973 Hampshire County Council has either been under no overall control or Conservative control, with the council currently having been under Conservative control since 1997. The next county council election is due in 2025.

Notable members
Henry Paulet, 16th Marquess of Winchester, Chairman 1904–1909
James Harris, 5th Earl of Malmesbury, Chairman 1927–1937
Sir Charles Chute, Baronet, Chairman 1938–1955
Sir John Crowder, member 1931–1946
Francis Manners, 4th Baron Manners
Horace King, Baron Maybray-King, member 1946–1965
John Denham, member 1981 to 1989, later a member of parliament
Mike Hancock, Leader 1989 to 1997, later a member of parliament
Henry Herbert, 7th Earl of Carnarvon, Chairman 1973 - 1977
Alexander Baring, 6th Baron Ashburton, member 1945-1972
Roy Perry, Leader 2013-2019
Percivall Pott, elected member, 1949, later member of parliament for Devizes in Wiltshire

References

 
Local government in Hampshire
Politics of Hampshire
County councils of England
1889 establishments in England
Local education authorities in England
Local authorities in Hampshire
Major precepting authorities in England
Leader and cabinet executives